"Steady Mobbin'" is a song recorded by Ice Cube and it was released as the first single from his second album Death Certificate.

The single contains the b-side, No Vaseline, which is a diss track towards N.W.A.

Samples
The song contains samples of "Reach Out" by Average White Band; "Love Amnesia" by Parlet; and "Dr. Funkenstein" and "Sir Nose d'Voidoffunk (Pay Attention – B3M)" by Parliament.

Charts

References

1991 songs
Ice Cube songs